Croatia participated in the Eurovision Song Contest 2022 in Turin, Italy, with "Guilty Pleasure" performed by Mia Dimšić. The Croatian broadcaster Croatian Radiotelevision (HRT) organised the national final  2022 to select the Croatian entry for the 2022 contest. Fourteen entries competed in the national final on 19 February 2022 and "Guilty Pleasure" performed by Mia Dimšić was selected as the winner following the combination of votes from ten regional juries and a public televote. 

Croatia was drawn to compete in the first semi-final of the Eurovision Song Contest which took place on 10 May 2022. Performing during the show in position 11, "Guilty Pleasure" was not announced among the top 10 entries of the first semi-final and therefore did not qualify to compete in the final. It was later revealed that Croatia placed eleventh out of the 17 participating countries in the semi-final with 75 points.

Background 

In , Croatia failed to qualify to the final with Albina and the song "Tick-Tock".

The Croatian national broadcaster, Croatian Radiotelevision (HRT), broadcasts the event within Croatia and organises the selection process for the nation's entry. HRT confirmed Croatia's participation in the 2022 Eurovision Song Contest on 13 September 2021. Between 1993 and 2011, HRT organised the national final  in order to select the Croatian entry for the Eurovision Song Contest. In 2012 and 2013, the broadcaster opted to internally select the entry. After missing the contest in 2014 and 2015, the Croatian broadcaster continued the internal selection procedure between 2016 and 2018. Since 2019, HRT has used  to select Croatia's entry, a method that was continued for their 2022 participation.

Before Eurovision

Dora 2022 
 2022 was the twenty-third edition of the Croatian national selection Dora which selected Croatia's entry for the Eurovision Song Contest 2022. The competition consisted of fourteen entries competing in one final on 19 February 2022 at the Marino Cvetković Sports Hall in Opatija, hosted by Duško Ćurlić,  and 2018 Croatian Eurovision entrant Franka Batelić. The show was broadcast on HRT 1 as well as online via the broadcaster's YouTube channel and streaming service HRTi.

Competing entries 
On 27 October 2021, HRT opened a submission period where artists and composers were able to submit their entries to the broadcaster with the deadline on 25 November 2021, which was later extended until 12 December 2021. 184 entries were received by the broadcaster during the submission period. A five-member expert committee consisting of Željko Mesar (HRT), Zlatko Turkalj (HRT), Robert Urlić (HRT), Antonela Doko (HGU) and Aljoša Šerić (HDS) reviewed the received submissions and selected fourteen artists and songs for the competition. HRT announced the competing entries on 17 December 2021.

Final 

The final took place on 19 February 2022. The winner, "Guilty Pleasure" performed by Mia Dimšić, was determined by a 50/50 combination of votes from ten regional juries and a public televote. The viewers and the juries each had a total of 580 points to award. Each jury group distributed their points as follows: 1-8, 10 and 12 points. The viewer vote was based on the percentage of votes each song achieved through telephone and SMS voting. For example, if a song gained 10% of the viewer vote, then that entry would be awarded 10% of 580 points rounded to the nearest integer: 58 points. Ties were decided in favour of the entry ranked higher by the public televote. In addition to the performances of the competing entries, host Franka Batelić and 2021 Croatian Eurovision entrant Albina performed as the interval acts during the show.

Preparation 
In late March, Mia Dimšić filmed the music video for "Guilty Pleasure" in Osijek, which was directed by Artem Dushkin and the company Lumiere Productions. The music video was released to the public on 1 April. An alternative video featuring the Croatian version of the song entitled "Netko drugi" was also released.

Promotion 
Mia Dimšić made several appearances across Europe to specifically promote "Guilty Pleasure" as the Croatian Eurovision entry. On 3 April, Mia Dimšić performed during the London Eurovision Party, which was held at the Hard Rock Hotel in London, United Kingdom and hosted by Paddy O'Connell and SuRie. On 7 April, Dimšić performed during the Israel Calling event held at the Menora Mivtachim Arena in Tel Aviv, Israel. On 9 April, Dimšić performed during the Eurovision in Concert event which was held at the AFAS Live venue in Amsterdam, Netherlands and hosted by Cornald Maas and Edsilia Rombley. On 16 April, Dimšić performed during the PrePartyES 2022 event which was held at the Sala La Riviera venue in Madrid, Spain and hosted by Ruth Lorenzo. In addition to her international appearances, Mia Dimšić performed during the Adriatic PreParty which was held online and organised by Hrvatski Eurovizijski Klub.

At Eurovision 

According to Eurovision rules, all nations with the exceptions of the host country and the "Big Five" (France, Germany, Italy, Spain and the United Kingdom) are required to qualify from one of two semi-finals in order to compete for the final; the top ten countries from each semi-final progress to the final. The European Broadcasting Union (EBU) split up the competing countries into six different pots based on voting patterns from previous contests, with countries with favourable voting histories put into the same pot. On 25 January 2022, an allocation draw was held which placed each country into one of the two semi-finals, as well as which half of the show they would perform in. Croatia was placed into the first semi-final, which was held on 10 May 2022, and was scheduled to perform in the second half of the show.

Once all the competing songs for the 2022 contest had been released, the running order for the semi-finals was decided by the shows' producers rather than through another draw, so that similar songs were not placed next to each other.

The two semi-finals and the final were broadcast in Croatia on HRT 1 with commentary by Duško Ćurlić. The Croatian spokesperson, who announced the top 12-point score awarded by the Croatian jury during the final, was Ivan Dorian Molnar.

Semi-final

Mia Dimšić took part in technical rehearsals on 1 and 5 May, followed by dress rehearsals on 9 and 10 May. This included the jury show on 9 May where the professional juries of each country watched and voted on the competing entries.

The Croatian performance featured Mia Dimšić in a pink silk dress and black boots designed by Ivan Tandarić and Aleksandar Šekuljica. The performance began with Dimšić alone on stage, while three dancers appeared by the end of the first chorus. The stage colours were predominantly pink and blue and Dimšić performed the bridge and final chorus of "Guilty Pleasure" in the Croatian language. The Croatian performance was choreographed by Igor Barberić. The dancers that joined Mia Dimšić on stage were Rebecca Krajnović, Roman Vrančić and Danon Vrkić, while two off-stage backing vocalists that joined Dimšić were: Bruna Oberan and Josip Palameta.

At the end of the show, Croatia was not announced among the top 10 entries in the first semi-final and therefore failed to qualify to compete in the final. It was later revealed that Croatia placed eleventh in the semi-final, receiving a total of 75 points: 33 points from the televoting and 42 points from the juries.

Voting 

Below is a breakdown of points awarded to Croatia during the first semi-final. Voting during the three shows involved each country awarding two sets of points from 1-8, 10 and 12: one from their professional jury and the other from televoting. The exact composition of the professional jury, and the results of each country's jury and televoting were released after the final; the individual results from each jury member were also released in an anonymised form. The Croatian jury consisted of Dinko Komadina, Mia Elizabeta Negovetić, Nela, Pegi, and Saša Lozar. In the first semi-final, Croatia finished in eleventh place out of seventeen entries, marking the country's fourth consecutive non-qualification from the semi-finals.

Points awarded to Croatia

Points awarded by Croatia

Detailed voting results
The following members comprised the Croatian jury:
 Dinko Komadina - TV producer, broadcaster
 Mia Elizabeta Negovetić - Singer-songwriter, participated in Dora 2022
 Nela – Performer, musician
 Pegi – Singer-songwriter
 Saša Lozar – Singer-songwriter

References

External links 

2022
Countries in the Eurovision Song Contest 2022
Eurovision